Eugene Koranteng (born 20 December 1966) is a retired Ghanaian triple jumper.

He won the gold medal at the [[1989 African Championships in 
This was his career best jump. He later competed at the 1991 World Championships, but failed to get a valid mark.Married to Elizabeth Brew Koranteng 
Has two children

References

External links

1966 births
Living people
Ghanaian male triple jumpers
20th-century Ghanaian people
21st-century Ghanaian people